Forsythe may refer to:

 Forsythe (surname), including a list of people with the name
 Forsythe Technology, Inc., an American business
 Edwin B. Forsythe National Wildlife Refuge, a United States conservation area
 Forsythe Championship Racing, a racing team
 Forsythe (programming language), a programming language by John C. Reynolds based on ALGOL 60
 Forsythe Pendleton Jones, in the Archie comics, the formal name for Jughead Jones

See also 
Forsyte (disambiguation)
Forsyth (disambiguation)